Ludwig Ingwer Nommensen (6 February 1834 – 23 May 1918) was a German Lutheran missionary to Batak Lands, North Sumatra who also translated the New Testament into the native Batak language and the first Ephorus (bishop) of Batak Christian Protestant Church. Stephen Neill, a historian of missions, considered Nommensen one of the greatest missionaries of all time. He is commemorated as a missionary on 7 November in the Calendar of Saints of the Lutheran Church with John Christian Frederick Heyer and Bartholomäus Ziegenbalg.

Nommensen was born in the Nordstrand peninsula in 1834, when the area was part of Denmark before it became part of Germany. In 1846, a horse cart rolled over his legs, crushing them. The initial prognosis was that he would be unlikely to walk again. After praying for recovery, some three years later, he was able to walk again.

An interest in Christian missionary work led to Nommensen's enrolment at the Rhenish Missionary Society seminary at Wuppertal-Barmen in 1857. He was sent as a missionary to Sumatra in 1862. He focused his attention on the Batak people of the interior of Sumatra. His first mission station was in the  Valley. He experienced initial difficulties, but later succeeded in converting several local chiefs and their followers to Christianity. He reported that 2000 Batak people had converted to Christianity by 1865. At first most converts had to leave their villages and come to live with Nommensen in his Huta dame (Village of Peace). In 1878 he completed the first translation of the New Testament into the Batak language.

In the same year, he and his fellow missionaries, and the Christian Batak people themselves, were threatened by the Batak priest king Sisingamangaraja XII, who, with support from Aceh, was involved in a war against the Dutch occupants. In the subsequent military expedition against Singamangaraja XII, known as the First Toba War, Nommensen played a prominent role in serving the colonial army as an interpreter and cultural consultant. Nommensen himself laid out his involvement in the war in a report that was published in BRMG 12, 1878:361–81, in which he explained that his involvement was aimed to save lives and to avoid Dutch brutal punitive action against local villages. After the war, Nommensen was seen by Batak people as the one who could protect them against Dutch influence.

In 1890, he moved north to the village of  near Laguboti. The area had greater Islamic influences, but Nommensen remained successful in building an indigenous Batak church. He had already instituted a church order and hierarchy, overseen by a Batak ephorus. By the time of his death the church numbered 180,000 members, with 34 Batak pastors and 788 teacher-preachers. Today most Toba Batak Christians belong to the Batak Christian Protestant Church (HKBP), one of the largest church denominations in Asia.

He was awarded an honorary doctorate of theology by the University of Bonn, and in 1911 he was made an Officer of the Order of Orange-Nassau. The Batak Christian University at Medan and Pematang Siantar was named Nommensen University in 1954.

Stephen Neill, in his History of Christian Missions, described Nommensen as “one of the most powerful missionaries of whom we have record anywhere” (page 348). Another source wrote, “Nommensen may have been one of the most successful missionaries ever to preach the gospel” (Ambassadors for Christ, ed. by J. Woodbridge, page 146).

References
Ludwig Nommensen Missionary to Sumatra
 Scott W. Sunquist, ed., Dictionary of Asian Christianity (Grand Rapids, 2001), p. 608
 Gustav Menzel, Ein Reiskorn auf der Strasse: Ludwig I. Nommensen, "Apostel der Batak", (1984)
 I.L. Nommensen. Endgültiger Bericht über den Krieg in Sumatra. BRMG (Berichte der Rheinischen Missions-Gesellschaft) 1878 (12): 361-381
 Werner Raupp, "Nommensen, Ludwig Ingwer". In: Biographisch-Bibliographisches Kirchenlexikon (BBKL). Band 6, Bautz, Herzberg 1993, Sp. 1002–1006.
 Stephen Neil, A History of Christian Missions, (London: Penguin, 1964).

1834 births
1918 deaths
Batak
People celebrated in the Lutheran liturgical calendar
People from the Duchy of Schleswig
Translators of the Bible into the languages of Indonesia
German Lutherans
German Lutheran missionaries
Lutheran missionaries in Indonesia
19th-century translators
Missionary linguists
Indonesian Lutherans
German expatriates in Indonesia
German expatriates in the Dutch East Indies
19th-century Lutherans